Goldkronach (East Franconian: Gronich) is a town in the district of Bayreuth, in Bavaria, Germany. It is situated near the Fichtelgebirge, 12 km northeast of Bayreuth.

History

On 25 June 1836, at 22:15, residents awoke to a man yelling "Fire! Fire!". In almost 2 hours, almost half of the eastern part of the town burned down, including the parish church, all two schools, the City Hall, 55 houses, and 16 other buildings. 127 families were rendered homeless. Three years later, on 18 June 1839 midnight, another fire broke out in the market. Within two hours, 29 houses and 17 buildings in the south side of town became the victims of the fire.

Population development
 1961: 2945
 1970: 2935
 1987: 2903
 2000: 3598
 2010: 3606

Sons and daughters of the city

 Sigismund von Reitzenstein (1766-1847), politician and diplomat of Baden

Personalities who lived and worked in Goldkronach

 Georgius Agricola (1494-1555), scholar of the Renaissance and the father of the mineralogy. For Goldkronach in his writings, Agricola called a weekly gold transfer of 1500 Gulden.
 Alexander von Humboldt (1769-1859), German natural scientist, from 1792 to 1796 Oberbergmeister and Oberbergrat in the Prussian Goldkronach. Humboldt revolutionized mining from a technical point of view, but also introduced measures for the education and social protection of miners.

References

Bayreuth (district)